The Wester Ross Coastal Trail is a route in the Western part of the Scottish Highlands. The route consists of the A832 road, the A896 road and the Applecross Peninsula. The northern end of the route is the junction with the A835 south of Ullapool. The southern end of the route is at Auchtertyre near Kyle of Lochalsh.

Route
From the north, the route passes the following places:

An Teallach - 1,062m
Little Loch Broom,
Loch Ewe,
Tournaig,
Gairloch and Loch Gairloch,
Loch Maree,
Slioch - 981m
Beinn Eighe - 1,110m
Fionn Bheinn - 933m
Loch Torridon
Torridon
Loch Shieldaig
Applecross
Bealach na Ba - fabulous mountain pass
Lochcarron
An Ruadh-stac - 892m
Auchtertyre

References

Roads in Scotland
Tourist attractions in Highland (council area)
Scenic routes in the United Kingdom